Esmaeil Sohrabi is an Iranian retired military officer who served as the Chief-of-Staff of the Islamic Republic of Iran Army from 25 October 1984 until May 1988.

He was an infantry staff colonel when appointed by Ayatollah Khomeini to the office.

References

Living people
Islamic Republic of Iran Army brigadier generals
People from Kermanshah
Year of birth missing (living people)